Institut Montaigne is a think tank based in Paris, France, founded in 2000. Institut Montaigne's makes public policy recommendations to advance its agenda, which broadly reflects that of the large French companies that fund it. It contracts experts from the French business community, academia, civil society and government.

Research

Institut Montaigne focuses on four main policy fields:
 Social cohesion: education, higher education, employment, lifelong learning
 Public policy: pension, justice, healthcare, environment, European issues
 Competitiveness: firms, energy, transports, SMB, digital economy, financial markets regulation
 Public finances: taxation, local finances, public spending, local authorities.

Institut Montaigne is also involved in promoting innovative democratic platforms. In 2011, the think tank led an ambitious research program under the supervision of Gilles Kepel on the suburban cities of Clichy-sous-Bois and Montfermeil where the 2005 riots sparked. The findings were published in the book “Banlieue de la République”. This work was later completed by “Passion française”, a political essay based on a series of interviews conducted in the cities of Roubaix and Marseille to meet candidates of foreign origin who ran for the 2012 legislative elections.

Institut Montaigne feeds the public debate by providing accurate data and assessment tools. During the 2012 presidential campaign, Institut Montaigne forecasted the budgetary impact of the main candidates’ programs. A similar initiative was undertaken  during the 2014 municipal campaign in France's 10 largest cities, as well as for the 2015 regional campaign. During the 2017 presidential campaign, on top of quantitative analyses, it evaluated over 120 electoral program promises and proposals.

Institut Montaigne also developed a game dedicated to public finances, allowing players to understand how budgetary and macroeconomic policies impact the French public deficit and the national debt.

Institut organizes political forums to which citizens are invited to draft new policies. For instance, in 2012, Institut Montaigne held a citizen's conference on the French healthcare system. A representative panel of 25 participants was informed of the functioning of the healthcare system, its challenges and its issues. After a series of workshops, the panel released a report in which it stated its main policy proposals.

Activities

Institut Montaigne expresses concrete policy proposals to enhance both competitiveness and social cohesion. The ideas are conveyed through four types of publications:
 Reports, which is the work produced by dedicated taskforces 
 Studies, produced by one or a group of experts
 Policy briefs, which react to current policy issues
 Books and collective works, which provide an in-depth analysis of a specific issue.

Recent publications (in English)
 A New Strategy for France in a New Arab World (August 2017)
 Syria: to End a Never-Ending War (June 2017)
 What Role for Cars in Tomorrow’s World? (June 2017)
 The Europe We Need (March 2017)
 The Circular Economy: Reconciling Economic Growth with the Environment (November 2016)
 A French Islam Is Possible (September 2016)
 Rebuilding France’s National Security (September 2016)
 Religious Discrimination in Access to Employment: a Reality (October 2015)
 Big Data and the Internet of Things: Making France a Leader in the Digital Revolution (April 2015)

Controversies

Actions during the 2012 presidential campaign 
In April 2012 the Montaigne Institute was criticized for effectively advertising for Nicolas Sarkozy, at a time in the campaign when advertising by political parties counted against the candidates budget limit. Indeed, a March to April advertising campaign by the Montaigne institute put forward a proposal which closely matched some remarks made by the president-candidate, Nicolas Sarkozy, leading to an investigation by the French media regulator (CSA).
This proposal had already been formulated by the Montaigne Institute in 2006 in a study by Jacques Bichot. 
Other proposals put forward during this campaign echo François Hollande's programs, such as those on priority in primary school, defended by the Montaigne Institute in its report Vaincre Failure in Primary School in 2010.

Following the intervention of the CSA, BFMTV, BFM Radio or even RMC cease broadcasting for the duration of the campaign of the spots of the Institut Montaigne in favor of Nicolas Sarkozy's proposals. The Montaigne Institute also quantified the measures proposed by the candidates for the presidential election, in partnership with the newspaper Les Échos.
The quality of this work has been disputed; for Médiapart "the ideological presuppositions, the absence of a guarantee on the impartiality of the calculations or the secret kept on the identity of the" encryptors "cast suspicion on this project".

During the campaign, La Chaîne européenne (LCP) had Laurent Bigorgne, then director of the Montaigne Institute, as editorial writer for his political program Thèmes de campagne. This program, presented by Patrick Poivre d'Arvor, received, from March to June 2012, Pascal Lamy, Nicole Notat, Thierry Breton and Jacques Attali.

Actions during the 2017 presidential campaign 
The president of the institute, Laurent Bigorgne, contributed to Emmanuel Macron's campaign from April 2016 onwards. The analysis of the candidates' economic programs by the Montaigne Institute and the Les Échos newspaper supported that of Emmanuel Macron and severely criticized left wing candidates Jean-Luc Mélenchon and Benoit Hamon.

The institute has subsequently been close to Macrons's government. Prime Minister Édouard Philippe attended in November 2018 the lunch between member companies and political figures that the think tank organizes. Laurent Bigorgne was appointed in June 2018 to the Public Action Committee 2022, installed by the prime minister to design the state reform project, then was invited to debate with Emmanuel Macron on March 22, 2019, with sixty-five other intellectuals, to deal with the yellow vests crisis. Gilles Babinet, the institute's referent on the digital issue, was appointed by the government as vice-president of the National Digital Council in May 2018.

Financial regulation and public or private corruption 
The institute details its work and firm positions in terms of financial regulation and against bribery on the French version of this entry. 
The presence on the steering committee of Marwan Lahoud, a former Airbus executive cited by numerous publications as being at the center of a commission system, in the large-scale corruption scandal concerning Airbus., also raises the question of the Institut Montaigne's report on these questions.

Sexual harassment 
The long-time director of the institute, Laurent Bigorgne, was accused in February 2022 of drugging a younger staff member whom he was sexually pursuing with MDMA.  Bigorgne subsequently resigned.

Organisation

Board of directors 
Henri de Castries, president, Institut Montaigne
David Azéma, Vice President of Institut Montaigne, partner at Perella Weinberg Partners
Emmanuelle Barbara, managing partner, August Debouzy
Marguerite Bérard, head of BNP Paribas French Retail Banking
Jean-Pierre Clamadieu, chairman of the board of directors, Engie
Marwan Lahoud, chairman of ACE Capital Partners
Fleur Pellerin, former Minister, founder and CEO, Korelya Capital 
Natalie Rastoin, senior advisor of WPP
René Ricol, partner/co-founder, Ricol Lasteyrie Corporate Finance
Jean-Dominique Senard, vice president of Institut Montaigne, chairman of the board of directors, Renault
Arnaud Vaissié, co-founder and CEO, International SOS
Natacha Valla, economist and dean of science Po's School of Management and Innovation 
Florence Verzelen, executive vice president, Dassault Systèmes
Philippe Wahl, CEO, La Poste Groupe

Experts 
Institut Montaigne brings together a number of experts who provide research, policy recommendations, and analyses on a full range of public policy issues, in particular on our blogs.
 Gilles Babinet, advisor on digital issues 
Nicolas Bauquet, contributor on public transformation issues 
Nicolas Baverez, contributor on defense issues
Dalila Berritane, contributor on African issues
Patrick Calvar, special advisor on security and defense issues
Eric Chaney, economic advisor
Mathieu Duchâtel, contributor on Asian issues
Michel Duclos, special advisor for geopolitics
Hakim El Karoui, senior fellow
Benjamin Fremaux, senior fellow – energy and climate
François Godement, senior advisor for Asia
Christophe Jaffrelot, contributor in Indian issues
Marc Lazar, contributor on French and European political and institutional issues
Théophile Lenoir, contributor on digital issues 
Angèle Malâtre-Lansac, contributor on health issues
Cécile Maisonneuve, senior fellow – cities, territories, sustainable development
Bertrand Martinot, senior fellow – apprenticeship, employment, professional training
Laure Millet, contributor on health issues
Dominique Moïsi, special advisor for geopolitics 
Franck Morel, senior fellow – labor, employment, social dialogue
Soli Özel, senior fellow – international relations
Alexandre Robinet-Borgomano, contributor on Germany
Bruno Tertrais, senior fellow – strategic affairs 
Jean-Paul Tran Thiet, senior fellow
Francis Vérillaud, special advisor
Georgina Wright, contributor on European issues

Permanent staff 

Laurent Bigorgne has been the managing director of Institut Montaigne since 2011. Thirty-five permanent members of staff work there.

Budget and financial resources

Institut Montaigne is a non-profit organization, depending on the French law of 1901. In 2020, Institut Montaigne's annual budget amounted to 6.6 million euros. More than 190 companies, of all sizes and all industries, contribute every year to its operation, each one of them representing less than 2% of the total budget. About 300 legal persons also support Institut Montaigne's procedure. Their total support represents 1% of the operating budget of Institut Montaigne.

Members (the list is current as of 12 August 2022):
 ABB France,  Accuracy, ADIT, Aegis Média France, Air France-KLM, Airbus, Allen & Overy, Allianz, Alvarez & Marsal France, ArchiMed, Ardian, AT Kearney, August Debouzy avocats, AXA, Archery Strategy Consulting,
 Baker & McKenzie, Bank of America Merrill Lynch, BNI France and Belgium, BearingPoint, BNP Paribas, Bolloré, Boston Consulting Group, Bouygues, Groupe BPCE, Bred Banque Populaire, Brunswick,
 d’Angelin & Co, Caisse des dépôts et consignations, Capgemini, Carbonnier Lamaze & Rasle & Associés, Careit, Carrefour, Groupe Casino, CGI France, Chaîne Thermale du Soleil, CIS, Cisco Systems France, CNP Assurances, Cohen Amir-Aslani, Conseil Supérieur du Notariat, Crédit Agricole, Crédit foncier de France, Davis Polk & Wardwell
 De Pardieu Brocas Maffei, Dentsu Aegis Network, Development institute international,
 EDF, Elsan, Engie, Equancy, Électricité de France, Eurazeo, Eurostar,
 Foncière INEA
 Gaillard Partners, Gras Savoye, Groupama, Groupe Edmond de Rothschild, Groupe M6, Groupe Orange,
 Groupe Randstad France, 
 Henner, HSBC France,
 IBM France, IFPASS, ING Bank France, INSEEC, International SOS, Ionis Education Group, ISRP
 Jalma, Jeant et Associés,
 Kantar, KPMG,
 La Banque Postale, La Parisienne Assurances, Laboratoires Servier, Lazard, Linedata Services, LIR, LivaNova, LVMH
 MACSF, Malakoff Médéric, Mazars, McKinsey & Company, Média-Participations, Mercer, Meridiam, Michelin, Microsoft France, 
 Nestlé France,
 Obea, Ondra Partners,
 PAI Partners, Pierre & Vacances, Plastic Omnium
 Radiall, Raise, Ramsay Générale de Santé RATP Group, Randstad, REDEX, Renault, Rexel, Ricol, Lasteyrie et Associés, Robertson Simon, Roche, Roland Berger, Rothschild & Cie Banque,
 Sanofi, Santéclair, Schneider Electric, SGS, Servier, Siaci Saint Honoré, Sia Partners, Sier Constructeur, SNCF, SNCF reseau, Sodexo, Solvay, Stallergenes, Suez Environnement,
 Tecnet Participations, The Boston Consulting Group, TIGF, Tilder, Total S.A.
 UBS France, 
 Veolia Environnement, Vinci, Vivendi, Voyageurs du monde,

References

Political and economic think tanks based in France
Think tanks based in France
2000 establishments in France